Aleksandr Abramovich Drakokhrust (November 11, 1923 – November 14, 2008) was a  Russian language poet, journalist and translator from the Soviet Union.

Drakokhrust was born in Moscow, into the Jewish family of Rachel Karachunskaya and Abram Drakokhrust, a soldier.

With the beginning of the Great Patriotic War he was conscripted into the Soviet Army and served until the very end of the war in sapper (combat engineering) troops, including taking part in the Battle of Berlin. Although he was a young able-bodied conscript, he was not allowed to serve in arms, being a family member of a "traitor to the motherland": his father was repressed in 1937, accused of being a Trotskyite, and shot. His mother served nine years in Karlag gulag labor camp for the same reason.

For his service he was awarded two Orders of the Patriotic War, two Orders of the Red Star and a number of medals. In 1945 he graduated from the Moscow Mititary Engineering School. From 1946 he became a military correspondent, first in Germany, later in the Russian Far East, and finally in Belarus. In 1962 he graduated from Khabarovsk  Pedagogical Institute.

He published his first poem in 1939, in an Odessa newspaper Molodaya Gvardiya. His first book of poems was published in 1951 in Vladivostok. During 1950-1990 he published 16 books of poems. He also translated a number of Belarusian poets into Russian language.

References

1923 births
2008 deaths
Writers from Moscow
Russian Jews
20th-century Belarusian poets
Russian male poets
Soviet poets
20th-century Russian poets
Soviet male writers
20th-century Russian male writers
Belarusian male poets